Andrea Zordan (born 11 July 1992) is an Italian former racing cyclist, who competed for the  and  squads between 2014 and 2016.

Major results
2013
1st  Road race, National Under-23 Road Championships
1st Trofeo Edil C
1st Gran Premio di Poggiana

References

External links
 

1992 births
Living people
Italian male cyclists
Sportspeople from Venice
Cyclists from the Metropolitan City of Venice